The 1928 French Championships (now known as the French Open) was a tennis tournament that took place on the outdoor clay ourts at the Stade Roland-Garros in Paris, France. The tournament ran from 24 May until 4 June. It was the 33rd staging of the French Championships and the second Grand Slam tournament of the year. It was the first tournament held at the new Roland-Garros stadium which was built during the winter of 1927/1928.

In the women's singles, Helen Wills Moody became the first American to win the singles event.

Finals

Men's singles

 Henri Cochet (FRA) defeated  René Lacoste (FRA) 5–7, 6–3, 6–1, 6–3

Women's singles

 Helen Wills (USA) defeated  Eileen Bennett (GBR) 6–1, 6–2

Men's doubles
 Jean Borotra (FRA) /  Jacques Brugnon (FRA) defeated  Henri Cochet (FRA) /  René de Buzelet (FRA) 6–4, 3–6, 6–2, 3–6, 6–4

Women's doubles
 Phoebe Holcroft Watson (GBR) /  Eileen Bennett Whittingstall (GBR) defeated  Suzanne Devé (FRA) /  Sylvie Lafaurie (FRA) 6–0, 6–2

Mixed doubles
 Eileen Bennett Whittingstall (GBR) /  Henri Cochet (FRA) defeated  Helen Wills (USA) /  Frank Hunter (USA) 3–6, 6–3, 6–3

References

External links
 French Open official website

French Championships
French Championships (tennis) by year
May 1928 sports events
June 1928 sports events
1928 in Paris
French